Pitcairnia inermis is a plant species in the genus Pitcairnia. This species is native to Bolivia.

References

inermis
Flora of Bolivia